Kerala State Industrial Development Corporation Ltd. is the industrial and investment promotion agency of the Government of Kerala (India), for the promotion and development of medium and large scale units in the State of Kerala. As the Nodal Agency for foreign and domestic investments in Kerala, KSIDC provides support for investors, besides processing various incentive schemes and facilitating interaction between the government and the industrial sector.

Established in 1961, KSIDC is led by a group of professionals from various fields including Engineering, Management, Finance and Law. It has two offices in Kerala - the head office at Trivandrum (Thiruvananthapuram) and a regional office at Kochi (Cochin), Ernakulam.
Shri. Paul Antony is the Chairman of KSIDC and Shri. Harikishore S IAS is the managing director of KSIDC.

Areas of focus 
KSIDC assists in identifying the infrastructure needs of the State, structuring projects to bridge the gaps and spearheading a balanced growth of the core competencies of the State. The key areas of KSIDC's focus includes:

Identification of Investment Ideas
Translating ideas into concrete proposals
Feasibility Study, Project Evaluation
Financial Structuring, Loan Syndication
Assisting in Central and State Govt. Clearances
Development and Administration of Growth Centers
Industrial and Infrastructure development

, KSIDC has promoted more than 700 projects in the State of Kerala with an investment outlay of over Rs.8000 crores providing employment to over 1 Lakh persons.

References

External links

Companies based in Thiruvananthapuram
State agencies of Kerala
Government-owned companies of Kerala
State industrial development corporations of India
1961 establishments in Kerala
Government agencies established in 1961